Texhuacán is a municipality located in the montane central zone in the State of Veracruz, about 205 km from state capital Xalapa. It has a surface of 32.90 km2.

Geographic limits

The municipality of Texhuacán is delimited to the north by Los Reyes, to the east by Zongolica to the south by Mixtla de Altamirano, to the west by Astacinga and Tlaquilpa. It is watered by the river Talcoco and several permanent or temporary creeks, which are tributaries of the Silly, affluent Rio of the Papaloapan.

Agriculture

It produces principally maize and coffee.

Celebrations

The celebration in honor of San Juan Bautista, Patron of the town, takes place in Texhuacán in June, while the celebration in honor of Virgen de Guadalupe takes place in December.

Weather

The weather in Texhuacán is very cold and wet all year with rains in summer and autumn.

References

External links 

  Municipal Official webpage
  Municipal Official Information

Municipalities of Veracruz